Miller Creek or Millers Creek may refer to:

Streams
Miller Creek (Black River), a stream in Missouri
Miller Creek (Carpenterville, Oregon), listed on the NRHP in Oregon
Miller Creek (Good Creek tributary), a stream in Montana
Miller Creek (Klamath County, Oregon) impounding into Gerber Dam, Oregon
Miller Creek (Marin County, California), a stream
Miller Creek (Saint Louis River), a stream in Minnesota
Miller Creek (Sixtymile River tributary), stream in Yukon, Canada
Miller Creek (South Dakota)
Miller Creek (San Leandro Creek) a tributary of San Leandro Creek, Alameda County, California
Miller Creek (Tug Fork), a stream in West Virginia
Millers Creek (Brazos River), a stream in Texas
Millers Creek, North Carolina, an unincorporated community
Millers Creek (Ohio), a stream in Ohio

Schools
 Millers Creek Christian School
 Miller Creek Elementary School District, a school district in San Rafael, California

See also